Aiva is a Latvian feminine given name. The associated name day is March 12.

Notable people named Aiva
Aiva Aparjode (born 1977), Latvian luger

See also 
 AIVA (Artificial Intelligence Virtual Artist), an electronic music composer

References 

Feminine given names
Latvian feminine given names